Leo or Léo may refer to:

Acronyms
 Law enforcement officer
 Law enforcement organisation
 Louisville Eccentric Observer, a free weekly newspaper in Louisville, Kentucky
 Michigan Department of Labor and Economic Opportunity

Arts and entertainment

Music
 Leo (band), a Missouri-based rock band that was founded in Cleveland, Ohio
 L.E.O. (band), a band by musician Bleu and collaborators

Film 
 Leo (2000 film), a Spanish film
 Leo (2002 film), a British-American film
 Leo, a 2007 Swedish film by Josef Fares
 Leo (2012 film), a Kenyan film
 Leo the Lion (MGM), mascot of the Metro-Goldwyn-Mayer film studio
 Leo (2023 American film)
 Leo (2023 Indian film)

Television
 Leo Awards, a British Columbian television award
 "Leo", an episode of Being Erica
 Léo, fictional lion in the animation Animal Crackers
 Léo, 2018 Quebec television series created by Fabien Cloutier

Companies
 Leo Namibia, former name for the TN Mobile phone network in Namibia
 Leo Pharma, an international pharmaceutical company, based in Denmark
 Leo Records, an English jazz record label
 Lioré et Olivier, a French aircraft manufacturer from 1912 to 1937
 The Leo Group, a waste-recycling company based in Halifax, England

People

Name lists
 Leo (given name), a list of people and fictional characters with the given name or nickname
 Léo, a list of people with the given name
 Leo (surname), a list of people
 Leonid dynasty, also known as the House of Leo, a Byzantine dynasty

Single names
 Arakel Babakhanian (1860–1932), known by his pen name Leo, Armenian historian
 Leo (singer) (born 1990), South Korean pop musician 
 Léo (footballer, born 1975), full name Leonardo Lourenço Bastos, Brazilian football leftback
 Leo (footballer, born November 1989), full name Leonardo Passos Alves, Brazilian football striker
 Leo (footballer, born December 1989), full name Leandro Mariano da Silva, Brazilian football striker
 Léo (footballer, born 1990), full name Leonardo da Silva Vieira, Brazilian football goalkeeper
 Léo (footballer, born 1992), full name Leonardo José Peres, Brazilian football forward
 Leo (wrestler) (born 1989), Mexican professional wrestler
 Luiz Eduardo de Oliveira or Léo (born 1944), Brazilian comics writer

Places
 Léo Department, a department or commune of Sissili Province in southern Burkina Faso
 Léo, Burkina Faso, the capital city of Sissili Province and Léo Department
 Leo, a village that was merged into Leo-Cedarville, Indiana, U.S.
 Leo, Ohio, U.S.
 Leo, West Virginia, U.S., a ghost town
 Leo Islands, Nunavut, Canada

Science and technology

Astronomy and space exploration
 Launch and Early Orbit phase, of a space mission
 LEO (spacecraft), a lunar mission
 Low Earth orbit, a satellite path
 Leo (constellation), a constellation

Biology
 Leo (horse), an American Quarter Horse
 Leonberger or Leo, a breed of dog
 Long-term Ecosystem Observatory, a marine study project
 Leo, an obsolete genus now in Panthera

Computing
 LEO (computer), the first commercially used computers
 Leo (text editor), a computer program

Sports
 BC Lions or Leos, a Canadian Football League team
 The PBA Leo Awards, annual Philippine Basketball Association awards

Other uses
 Leo (astrology), an astrological sign
 LEO (website), a group of dual-language dictionaries and discussion forums
 Leo Petroglyph, a series of ancient stone carvings
 Leo clubs, youth branch of Lions Clubs International

See also
 Leos (disambiguation)
 Les Hurlements d'Léo, a French musical group
 Lio (disambiguation)
 St. Leo (disambiguation)
 Ultraman Leo, a 1974 tokusatsu television series